Oldeania is a genus of flowering plants belonging to the family Poaceae.

Its native range is Ethiopia to Zambia, Madagascar.

Species
Species:

Oldeania alpina 
Oldeania humbertii 
Oldeania ibityensis 
Oldeania itremoensis 
Oldeania madagascariensis 
Oldeania marojejyensis 
Oldeania perrieri

References

Bambusoideae
Bambusoideae genera